Cotton Hayden Allen (1834–January 26, 1900) was the 31st mayor of Columbus, Ohio and the 28th person to serve in that office.   He served Columbus for one term.  His successor, Samuel L. Black, took office in 1897.  He died in 1900.

References

Bibliography

External links 
Cotton Hayden Allen at Political Graveyard

Mayors of Columbus, Ohio
1834 births
1900 deaths
Politicians from Auburn, New York
Ohio Democrats
19th-century American politicians